Henri Alphonse Hazebrouck (21 July 1877 in Roubaix – 1 December 1948 in Roubaix) was a French rower who competed in the 1900 Summer Olympics. He was part of the French boat Cercle de l'Aviron Roubaix, which won the gold medal in the coxed fours.

References

External links

Henri Hazebrouck's profile at databaseOlympics

1877 births
1948 deaths
French male rowers
Olympic rowers of France
Rowers at the 1900 Summer Olympics
Olympic gold medalists for France
Olympic medalists in rowing
Medalists at the 1900 Summer Olympics
Sportspeople from Roubaix